The 66th District of the Iowa House of Representatives in the state of Iowa.

Current elected officials
Art Staed is the representative currently representing the district.

Past representatives
The district has previously been represented by:
 George Kinley, 1971–1973
 Edgar Bittle, 1973–1977
 Patricia Thompson-Woodworth, 1977–1981
 Dorothy Carpenter, 1981–1983
 Daniel Jay, 1983–1993
 Dennis Renaud, 1993–1995
 Larry Disney, 1995–1997
 Geri Huser, 1997–2003
 Ed Fallon, 2003–2007
 Ako Abdul-Samad, 2007–2013
 Art Staed, 2013–present

References

066